The Middlesex County Hospital was operated by Middlesex County from the 1930s until 2001. Its property straddles the towns of Waltham and Lexington, Massachusetts. Originally a tuberculosis hospital, it eventually became the county hospital for Middlesex until its closure. The property was sold and redeveloped into a condominium community. It is located near the old Metropolitan State Hospital, which was closed in 1992 and has also been redeveloped into housing.

References

External links
Middlesex County Sanitarium on the Asylum Project

County government agencies in Massachusetts
Waltham, Massachusetts
Buildings and structures in Lexington, Massachusetts
Hospitals in Middlesex County, Massachusetts
Defunct hospitals in Massachusetts
Hospitals disestablished in 2001